The role of women in Egypt has changed throughout history, from ancient to modern times. From the earliest preserved archaeological records, Egyptian women were considered equal to men in Egyptian society, regardless of marital status.

Women in ancient Egypt

Women were stated lower than men when it came to a higher leader in the Egyptian hierarchy counting his peasants. This hierarchy was similar to the way the peasants were treated in the Middle Ages.  As children, females were raised to be solely dependent upon their fathers and older brothers. When women married, they depended on their husbands to make all decisions, while the women themselves were depended upon to carry out household chores.

Married Egyptian women were expected by their husband's families to bear children, but particularly males. It was common for married couples to continue to reproduce until bearing at least two sons. Barrenness was considered a severe misfortune for Egyptian women, as well as the inability to produce male offspring. Women who had only bore females were given derogatory names, such as "mothers of brides". A family with well-grown sons was considered to have decent security. An Egyptian woman was thought to be at the peak of her power when her sons had married because she automatically acquired the control over the newly growing families of her sons.

Women have traditionally been preoccupied with household tasks and child rearing and have rarely had opportunities for contact with men outside the family. Royal Egyptian women had great impact on Egyptian Society. Queen Tiye, the grandmother of King Tut was so enmeshed in politics that neighboring King Mitanni wrote to her to ensure good will between their people when her son Akhenaten ascended to the throne. Queen Aahmose was awarded the golden flies for military valor.

Cleopatra and Nefertiti were among the better known rulers in Egyptian society. Cleopatra was known to have ruled with Marc Antony around 31 BC and she was also the Co-regent of her two husband-brothers and her son. Nefertiti was the chief wife of an Egyptian pharaoh, Amenhotep IV. Nefertiti was known to be an active Egyptian woman in society, as well as her children. In addition to female Egyptian rulers, Hatshepsut usurped the throne and reigned in Egypt as pharaoh from about 1503 to 1480 B.C. She based most of Egypt's economy on commerce.

Though not many women have acted as rulers in Egyptian society, they have been considered to be equal among men in status as well as legal opportunities. Women were shown to be allowed the opportunity to take part in the economy, such as their role as merchants, as it happened later in the Roman Empire, specially among the lower classes. Women had also taken part in religious activities, such as those who were priestesses. In the Sixth Dynasty Nebet became a Vizier and thus the first woman in History to fulfill such an office.

Women could also own property, divorce their husbands, live alone and occupy main positions, mostly religious, in similarity with Assyrian women. Only the children from the Great Royal Wife could expect to succeed to the throne, and if there were no son but daughters by her, then a son by another wife or concubine could only get the throne by marrying the heir daughter, and whoever did so would become the new King.  Either through political and/or religious power, some women managed to become, de facto or de jure, the highest office holders in the kingdom, and share a status of co-rulers with men, even being depicted in monuments with the same height as their husbands or otherwise and even as the other Gods of Egypt.

Such were the cases of Hatshepsut, Nefertiti, Nefertari and the Nubian Egyptian Queens. The further Nubian Queens were able to maintain this status. The most important religious offices of that kind were those of God's Wife and God's Wife of Amun. Politically, they often managed to become Interregnum queens. In the Ptolemaic Dynasty this rise to power was sublimated with the establishment of a coregency system, in which Queens had the same position as Kings and were even powerful enough to obtain in dispute that coregency for themselves.

19th century
Circa the 1890s, twice the percentage of women in Alexandria knew how to read compared to the same percentage in Cairo. As a result, specialist women's publications like al-Fatāh by Hind Nawal, the country's first women's journal, appeared.

Modern status

To limit women's contact with men as tradition, practices such as veiling and gender segregation at schools, work, and recreation have become common.  Furthermore, lower-class families, especially in Upper-Egypt, have tended to withdraw females from school as they reached puberty to minimize their interaction with males. Lower-class men frequently preferred marriage to women who had been secluded rather than to those who had worked or attended secondary school.

The rule of Gamal Abdul Nasser was characterized by his policy of stridently advocating women's rights through welfare-state policies, labeled as state feminism. Women were guaranteed the right to vote and equality of opportunity was explicitly stated in the 1956 Egyptian constitution, forbidding gender-based discrimination. Labor laws were changed to ensure women's standing in the work force and maternity leave was legally protected. At the same time, the state repressed independent feminist organizations, leaving a dearth of female political representation.

The economic liberalization plan of the Sadat regime resulted in the collapse of this system and the resurgence of Islamist-influenced policy. While the Nasserist years allowed a wide range of study for women, Sadat's policies narrowed the opportunities available to women. Unemployment for women changed from 5.8% 1960 to 40.7% in 1986. In place of policies to economically support women during pregnancy, women were encouraged to leave work entirely or work part-time.

The Mubarak years were marked by further erosion of the role of women. Preserved parliamentary seats for women and the 1979 personal status law were repealed in 1987, a new watered-down law taking its place that allowed less power for women in cases of divorce.

The migration of a large number of Egyptians, mostly men, has also affected the status of Egyptian women. A study by the International Organization for Migration found that two-thirds of migrant household interviewed were headed by a woman in the absence of the male migrant (husband/father). For these households, remittances represented an important source of income, accounting for 43% of their total income. 52% of wives of the migrants independently decided how to spend the money received. In the remaining cases, the head of the household enjoyed a fair deal of autonomy as the decision on how to use the remittance money was reached through mutual consultation between the migrant and the head of the household and only in a few cases (11%) did the migrant decide alone.

A 2010 Pew Research Center poll showed that 45% of Egyptian men and 76% of women supported gender equality. The same poll showed that, in principle, people tend to accept a woman's right to work outside the home, with 61% of the respondents agreeing that "women should be able to work outside the home", but at the same time showing some reservations, with only 11% of men and 36% of women completely agreeing with that statement; and 75% agreeing that "when jobs are scarce, men should have more right to a job". Polls taken in 2010 and 2011 show that 39% considered gender equality "very important" to Egypt's future post-revolution and 54% of Egyptians supported sex segregation in the workplace.

Despite long standing advocation for women's labor rights, that is not the case in 21st century Egypt. In the public sector women are more protected with labor rights that secure their position and provide benefits such as maternity leave. In the private sector there is little to no labor rights for women and companies are less likely to hire women because of implied “associated costs” such as childcare and maternity leave. Thus, women are discriminated against in the workforce and not given an opportunity to pursue their desired careers. That goes for women with or without education because jobs can be attained at various levels, but the preference goes to their male counterparts.

Female genital mutilation was criminalized in Egypt in 2008. In 2012, UNICEF reported that 87% of Egyptian women and girls 15–49 years old had undergone female genital mutilation. In June 2013, 13-year-old Soheir al-Batea died after undergoing FGM. The doctor responsible for the procedure became the first doctor in Egypt to be tried for committing female genital mutilation. On November 20, 2014, he was found not guilty.

Virginity tests done by the military on detainees were banned in Egypt on 27 December 2011.

The literacy rate of women (aged 15 and over) is 65.4%, which is lower than that of men which is 82.2% (data from 2015). Egypt is largely rural country, with only 43.1% of the population being urban (in 2015), and access to education is poor in rural areas.

Most women in Egypt have adopted some form of veiling, with a majority of Egyptian women covering at least their hair with the hijab; however covering the face with a niqāb is only practiced by a minority of women (see Niqāb in Egypt).

Families are usually of medium size, with the total fertility rate (TFR) being 3.53 children born/woman (2016 estimate). The contraception prevalence rate is high, at 60.3% (in 2008).

In a 2013 poll of gender experts, Egypt ranked worst for women's rights out of all the Arab states.

On 23 June 2020, Egyptian security forces detained prominent activist Sanaa Seif from outside the general prosecutor's office in the capital, Cairo, where she was waiting to file a complaint about being physically assaulted outside Cairo's Tora Prison complex on 22 June 2020.

According to Global Gender Gap Index, Egypt ranked 134th out of the 153 countries in 2020. It ranked 140th out of 153 countries in women's economic participation and opportunity. Only 18% of the working-age women participated in the economy, compared to 65% of men.

In March 2021, Egypt became the first country in Africa and MENA region to launch the "Closing the Gender Gap Accelerator" in cooperation with the World Economic Forum, in order to reduce the gender gap in the labor market. Also in the same month, the amendments of Personal Status Law, which were proposed on 23 February, were rejected by feminist organizations as they would deprive women of the legal status to conclude a marriage contract. However, the new amendments ignored granting women financial and educational guardianship over their minor children, and for Christian women, their denial of custody over their children, when their husbands convert to Islam.

Violence against women

Sexual violence and sexual harassment

In a 2010 survey of 1,010 women by the Egyptian Center for Women's rights, 98% of foreign women and 83% of native women said they had been sexually harassed in Egypt and two-thirds of men said that they had harassed women. In 2013, the United Nations Entity for Gender Equality and the Empowerment of Women reported that 99.3% of Egyptian women had experienced some form of harassment.

Forced virginity tests 
In December 2011, the Cairo Administrative court ruled that forced virginity tests on females in military prisons were illegal. The case involved Samira Ibrahim who participated at a sit-in at Tahrir Square on March 9, 2011. Ibrahim described the degrading experience of having a virginity test be conducted on her in front of military soldiers. Several other female protestors received similar treatment (see 2011 virginity tests of protestors in Egypt). In its World Report 2020, the Human Rights Watch reported that virginity tests still occurred in the country.

Sexual assault 
Human Rights Watch reported 91 sexual assaults in four days from 30 June 2013 during the Tahrir Square protests, as well as 19 cases of mob sexual assaults in January. The deputy Middle East director at HRW said that the attacks were "holding women back from participating fully in the public life of Egypt at a critical point in the country's development." On 4 June 2013, a law criminalizing sexual harassment for the first time in modern Egyptian history was approved by then interim president, Adly Mansour.

The 2014 Cairo hotel gang rape case in which a young woman was drugged and raped by a group of young men from wealthy families attracted wide social media and mainstream media attention, leading to the extradition of three of the accused men from Lebanon back to Egypt in September 2020. Egyptian Streets called the attention a #MeToo moment. In 2020 a social media campaign "Assault Police" was launched so that women could anonymously draw attention to perpetrators of sexual violence. The account was started by Nadeen Ashraf who wanted to enable women to have a voice and make their concerns heard.

In July 2021, several women opened up about their sexual abuse incidents during an interview with The New York Times. The women revealed that they were sexually abused in police stations, hospitals and prisons during routine searches by the police or prison guards and by state-employed doctors during invasive physical exams and virginity tests.

In August 2021, Egyptian President Abdel Fattah el-Sisi ratified law amendments to tighten the imprisonment term and the fine imposed on sexual harassment. However, Sisi's recent ratification is dismissed in a 2022 court case against famous Egyptian actor Shady Khalaf, who was charged with only 3 years of prison sentencing for his sexual assault and attempted rapes on "seven women at an acting workshop."

Honor killings
Honor killings take place in Egypt relatively frequently, due to reasons such as a woman meeting an unrelated man, even if this is only an allegation; or adultery (real or suspected). For example, in 2021, a man was convicted and sentenced to five years in prison for thinking his sister's behavior was "suspicious" and murdering her––a murder to which he claimed was an "honor killing."

Honor killings are also listed in the Egyptian Penal Code, under Article 237, in which courts are allowed to be more lenient in their sentencing for honor killings made by men who catch their wives committing adultery. However, the same leniency is not granted for women under the Article.

Female genital mutilation

Female genital mutilation (FGM) is widespread in Egypt, with 87% of girls and women aged 15 to 49 years having undergone FGM in 2004–15, though the practice is less common among the youth. The practice is deeply ingrained in the culture and predates both Christianity and Islam. Its main purpose is to preserve chastity, though its social function is very complicated. FGM was banned in 2008, but enforcement of the law was weak. In 2016, they tightened the law and made it a felony.

A 17-year-old girl died on 29 May 2017, reportedly from hemorrhaging, following female genital mutilation (FGM) at a private hospital in Suez Governorate. Four people faced trial on charges of causing lethal injury and FGM, including the girl's mother and medical staff as per an Amnesty 2016/2017 report.

In March 2021, the Egyptian Senate approved a new bill that would punish whoever conducts genital mutilation to five years in prison, while the act which results in a permanent handicap would lead to seven years with hard labor, and in case of death, the imprisonment should be no less than ten years. Women continued to lack adequate protection from sexual and gender-based violence, as well as gender discrimination in law and practice, particularly under personal status laws regulating divorce.

Sexual violence against LGBTQ Egyptians 
With the rise of LGBTQ rallies and protests in Egypt, a light is also being shed on the rise of sexual violence against the community. Egypt also has a ninth Article in its Penal code that deems homosexuality a criminal act and punishment for it an imprisonment "from 6 months to three years" and the person convicted can end up staying in person for up to 12 years depending on their act of "habitual debauchery." In 2015, a Harvard paper written on the topic of LGBTQ members in Egypt suggests that the reasonings behind the country's resentment towards the community is that the country is "largely conservative" and that the hatred is "rooted in societal gender and sexual norms."

In 2017, it was reported that "dozens" of LGBTQ Egyptians were arrested under the government of el-Sisi, and were charged for "sexual deviance," "insulting public morals," and "debauchery" and arrested due to those charges. Also, on October of that same year, an Egyptian member of the Parliament put forth the introduction of a bill that "criminalizes homosexuality" and a total of 60 members were ready to approve it as they signed it.

In 2020, a "crackdown" of LGBTQ members in Egypt began by the government. Police forces "entraped" members of the community through "social networking sites and dating applications" and gave them "harsh prison sentences." The detainees were a subject of "verbal and physical abuse" by police, and were given "forced anal exams" and "virginity tests." One woman reported that, due to the sexual abuse she endured from police, she "bled for three days and could not walk for weeks." Some detainees also claimed that the police allowed other inmates to abuse and torture them.

Personal status laws

Inheritance
As sectarianism is embedded in the political and judicial system, Egypt does not have a unified family law. Different laws apply based on one's religion. In case of Muslim family law, when someone passes away, two-thirds of their estate is distributed according to compulsory inheritance rules, wherein Muslim women receive half the inheritance of what their brothers get.

In 2019, a Coptic Christian woman challenged the Islamic rules, arguing that since Egypt allows for Christians to settle their own matters without Islamic influence, Egypt's inheritance laws do not apply to her. The court ruled in her favor, marking a landmark case.

Representation of women in politics

A constitutional referendum was held in Egypt in 2012. A constituent assembly was elected which drafted the new constitution. Of the 100 members of the assembly, only 7 were women. After the 2013 Egyptian coup d'état another constituent assembly was elected for a constitutional referendum in which 5 of the 50 members were women.

In the 2015 Egyptian parliamentary election women won 75 of the 568 seats up for election. A further 14 women and 14 men were appointed by president Sisi. With a percentage of 14.9%, it was the highest representation of women in Egyptian parliament yet.

Marriage and divorce

Marriage was considered a very important part in ancient Egyptian society. Marriage was an almost completely private affair, and as a result, not many records of marriage were kept. Furthermore, not all Egyptian marriages were arranged, rather, most daughters had persuaded their families for their approval towards their future spouses.

Egyptian women who were married were highly acknowledged. It was common for females to marry after the age of menstruation, such as age 14. They were usually considered married after they had left the protection of their father's house. It had also been acknowledged that though the woman became under her spouse's care, her husband did not become her legal guardian and the woman remained independent while controlling her own assets. For the non-royal women in ancient Egypt, the title of wife also came with the title "Mistress of the House". 
The role as a wife included taking care of the household.

Egypt's laws pertaining to marriage and divorce have changed over the years, however they have generally favored the social position of men, although reform continues. Egypt retained the inclusion of Islamic law in dealings of family law, following on from its judicial and administrative independence from the Ottoman Empire in 1874. Muslim husbands were traditionally allowed to have up to four wives at a time in accordance with Islamic religious custom, but a woman could have only one husband at a time.  A Muslim man could divorce his wife with ease by saying "I divorce thee" on three separate occasions in the presence of witnesses. The first reforms that changed this state of affairs came in the 1920s with Law No.25 of 1920 and 1929. These reforms included the following specifics regarding legitimate grounds for a woman requesting a divorce:

If her husband failed to provide maintenance. (nafaqah)
If her husband was found to have a dangerous or contagious disease.
If she was deserted by her husband. 
If she was maltreated by her husband.

In 1971 further reforms were made. Dr.Aisha Ratib became Minister of Social Affairs and in November the following revisions were suggested and implemented :

That the age for legal marriage should be raised to 18 for women and 21 for men
That the permission of a judge was required for polygamy
That divorces could not take place without a judge being present
That the mother should be allowed a greater period of guardianship, but also that guardianship in the case of divorce should go to the parent deemed most suitable to provide it
That judges should have more involvement in family law cases, and that female judges should be considered to deal with family law cases.

The government amended the laws relating to personal status in 1979. The amendments, which became known as the "women's rights law," were in the form of a presidential decree and subsequently approved by the People's Assembly. The leading orthodox Islamic clergy endorsed these amendments, but Islamist groups opposed them as state infringements of religious precepts and campaigned for their repeal. The amendments stated that polygamy was legally harmful to a first wife and entitled her to sue for divorce within a year after learning of her husband's second marriage. The amendments also entitled the first wife to compensation.

A husband retained the right to divorce his wife without recourse to the courts, but he was required to file for his divorce before witnesses at a registrar's office and officially and immediately to inform his wife. The divorced wife was entitled to alimony equivalent to one year's maintenance in addition to compensation equivalent to two years' maintenance; a court could increase these amounts under extenuating circumstances such as the dissolution of a long marriage. The divorced wife automatically retained custody of sons under the age of ten and daughters under twelve; courts could extend the mother's custody of minors until their eighteenth birthdays.

In 1985 Egyptian authorities ruled that the amendments of 1979 were unconstitutional because they had been enacted through a presidential decree while the People's Assembly was not in session. A new law reversed many of the rights accorded to women in 1979. A woman lost her automatic right to divorce her husband if he married a second wife. She could still petition a court to consider her case, but a judge would grant a divorce only if it were in the interests of the family. If a divorce were granted, the judge would also determine what was an appropriate residence for the divorced woman and her children.

The changes in divorce legislation in 1979 and 1985 did not significantly alter the divorce rate, which has been relatively high since the early 1950s. About one in five marriages ended in divorce in the 1980s. Remarriage was common, and most divorced men and women expected to wed again. Seven out of ten divorces took place within the first five years of marriage, and one out of three in the first year. The divorce rate depended on residence and level of education. The highest divorce rates were among the urban lower class, the lowest rates among the villagers of Upper Egypt. Throughout the country, as much as 95 percent of all divorces occurred among couples who were illiterate.

Marital rape is not specifically outlawed in Egypt.

Notable Egyptian women 

 Rawya Ateya, first female parliamentarian in the Arab world
 Mona Eltahawy, Egyptian American feminist activist
 Ester Fanous, Christian feminist
 Nadeen Ashraf, feminist activist
 Jehan El Sadat, former First Lady of Egypt 
 Sameera Moussa , nuclear physicist
 Nawal El Saadawi, feminist writer
 Maya Morsy, head of Egypt's National Council for Women
 Hoda Shaarawi, founder of the Egyptian Feminist Union
 Doria Shafik, early Egyptian feminist leader
 Safeya Zaghloul, former Wafd Party leader

See also
 678 (film)
 Abduction of Coptic women
 Egyptian Centre for Women's Rights
 Feminism in Egypt
 Gender inequality in Egypt
 HARASSmap
 Judiciary of Egypt
 Operation Anti Sexual Harassment
 Rape in Egypt
 Mass sexual assault in Egypt
 Women's role in the 2011 revolution

General:
Women in Islam
Women in Arab societies

References

 (Data from 1990.)

Sources
Beatty, Chester. 1998. egyptology.com (accessed April 12, 2009)
Brunner, Emma. 1979. Birth of Hatshepsut web.archive.org (accessed April 12, 2009).
Dunham, D. 1917. Naga-ed-Der Stelae of the First Intermediate Period.  fordham.edu (accessed April 12, 2009).
Piccione, Peter A. 1995. The Status of Women in Ancient Egyptian Society. web.archive.org (accessed April 12, 2009).
Tappan, Eva March. 1914. The World's Story: A History of the World in Story, Song and Art. fordham.edu (accessed April 12, 2009)
The Statues of Women in Egyptian Society. library.cornell.edu (accessed April 12, 2009)
Ward, William. The Egyptian Economy and Non-royal Women: Their Status in Public Life. stoa.org (accessed April 12, 2009)
Women in Ancient Egypt." Women in Ancient Egypt. N.p., n.d. Web. 07 Sept. 2016. Women in Ancient Egypt
El-Ashmawy, Nadeen. "Sexual Harassment in Egypt." Hawwa 15, no. 3 (2017): 225–256.

External links 

Ancient Egyptian Women

 
Egypt